Camping Mama: Outdoor Adventures, known in Japan as Camping Mama + Papa (キャンピングママ＋パパ Kyanpingu Mama + Papa) and in the PAL region as Cooking Mama World: Outdoor Adventures, is a 2011 video game for the Nintendo DS. It is a spin-off title in the Cooking Mama series. It features 38 levels with 100 camping-themed mini-games using the touch screen.

Development
The game was released in July 2011 in Japan, September 2011 in North America, and November 2011 in Europe. It was later bundled with Cooking Mama and released as Mama's Combo Pack Vol. 1 in North America, Europe, and Australia in late 2012.

Reception

Camping Mama received "mixed" reviews according to video game review aggregator Metacritic.

References

External links
Official English website

2011 video games
505 Games games
Cooking Mama
Cooking video games
Majesco Entertainment games
Nintendo DS games
Nintendo DS-only games
Video games developed in Japan
Simulation video games